Río San Juan is a department in Nicaragua. It was formed in 1957 from parts of Chontales and Zelaya departments. It covers an area of 7,543 km2 and has a population of 137,189 (2021 estimate). The capital is San Carlos.  The department also includes the Solentiname Islands archipelago and the San Juan River, after which it is named. Trinidad, in Río San Juan, is the most southerly point in Nicaragua.

Municipalities
 El Almendro
 El Castillo
 Morrito
 San Carlos
 San Juan de Nicaragua
 San Miguelito

References 

 
Departments of Nicaragua
States and territories established in 1957